Abdulla Ahmed Al Mandous is the current President of WMO Regional Association II (Asia). Al Mandous was elected as president unanimously during WMO conference held in Abu Dhabi in February 2017, and re-elected for a second term during the 17th Session of RA II (ASIA) convened virtually from 25 to 26 May 2021. Al Mandous is also Executive Director of the National Center of Meteorology, the government entity that provides statistical data and information on weather and climate to various entities and the public in the United Arab Emirates to carry out their daily functions.

Career
As the president of Regional Association for Asia, the most populous and largest region of WMO, the leadership of the association presented a particular challenge to Al Mandous to bring the community together. Following his election, Al Mandous outlined his strategy to address this challenge by saying:

"The first thing I want to do is create an efficient communication link between the permanent representatives in Asia so that we have a network that shares information together on a daily basis".

To achieve this goal, Al Mandous directed the establishment of two specialized web communication portals to assist Asian Members: WMO - Regional Association II - Asia Portal and GCC Permanent Committee of Meteorology Portal, hosted by National Center of Meteorology.

Since assuming the leadership of WMO Regional Association II (Asia), Al Mandous has chaired several sessions of the WMO’s Regional Association of ASIA and guided and coordinated the activities of the association and its working groups. He presented the views of the Association to WMO Congress and Executive Council on regional challenges and priorities in the implementation of meteorological activities.

Al Mandous is also the current executive director of the National Center of Meteorology (NCM) and the Permanent Representative of the UAE to WMO since 2008. Under his leadership, NCM undertook a large-scale modernization of its infrastructure and enhancement of the UAE’s national meteorological and seismological networks. He also contributed to the development of Arabian Peninsula Integrated Radar Observing System and led NCM’s efforts to set up The UAE Research Program for Rain Enhancement Science, which was launched under the patronage of His Highness Sheikh Mansour bin Zayed Al Nahyan, UAE Deputy Prime Minister and Minister of Presidential Affairs in 2015. The program aims to attract new researchers, technologists and entrepreneurs to further develop local and global capacity in rain enhancement to address the most pressing water-security challenges.

Furthermore, Al Mandous played an instrumental role in the development of National Integrated Observing System and Seismic Data & Information Network Center in the UAE. He supervised the development of the Integrated Radar Observing System at sub regional level contributing to disaster management, water security and International Civil Aviation Organization’s Global Air Navigation Plan 2013-2028. In doing so, Al Mandous led the efforts to unify the seismic engineering services and exchanging data related to earthquake and seismic activities at the regional and international levels

In July 2021, NCM launched under the direct supervision of Al Mandous the Science Dome, a high-tech 4D dome to visualise real-time and simulate weather data to help visitors understand the details of meteorology, geophysics and cloud seeding operations in an innovative way.

Prior to his current roles, he held several leadership positions spanning nearly two decades at several top governmental bodies responsible for atmospheric and seismographic monitoring and water resource management including Atmospheric Studies Center, Water Resources Studies Department, National Project of UNDP for Water Sources Studies, Precipitation Enhancement Program, among others.

Board memberships
Al Mandous serves on numerous local, regional and international boards, providing advice on issues related to weather monitoring and forecasting, water resource management, crisis management, among others. Some of these boards include:
Executive council of UN-World Meteorological Organization 
The National Center Meteorology Council at Ministry of Presidential Affairs
The Crisis and Emergency Management Committee
Union Aviation Council of UAE
Gulf Union for Water Science and Technology Council
Member of the Advisory Board of the College of Science, United Arab Emirates University

Studies
Al Mandous studied meteorology at the University of Saint Louis in the United States and earned a Bachelor of Science degree in 1989. Later, he pursued post-graduate studies in meteorology at the University of Witwatersrand in South Africa and earned a Master of Science degree in 2005.  He was awarded a PhD in Meteorology by The University of Belgrade, Serbia in 2012.

Highlight of honours received
The Emirates Award Certificate of Appreciation from His Highness Sheikh Mansour bin Zayed Al Nahyan for enhanced and improved weather and climate services at UAE
Kuwait Liberation Medal (Kuwait) Recipient from Emir of Kuwait
Certificate of Appreciation from the National Center for Atmospheric Research, NCAR, United States for UAE Rain Enhancement Project 
Middle East Executive Award for High level Executive Leadership.

References

University of the Witwatersrand alumni
1966 births
Living people
Meteorologists
Saint Louis University alumni
University of Belgrade alumni
Emirati expatriates in the United States